Soekisno Hadikoemoro (22 April 1932 – 14 March 2013) was a physician who served as the 5th rector of the Cenderawasih University from 1970 until 1974.

Early life 
Soekisno Hadikoemoro was born on 22 April 1932 in Pekalongan. He went to study at the People's School (Sekolah Rakyat, equivalent to elementary school) and graduated in 1946. He continued his studies at the Pekalongan Junior High School and graduated in 1950. He was later accepted at the High School Section B (science).

University studies 
After his graduation from the high school, he enrolled at the Forestry Faculty of the IPB University. During his studies, he was entrusted the position of assistant at the physics laboratory in 1956. He finished his studies in 1958 and obtained a degree in agricultural studies. After that, he continued his studies in agricultural climatology at the Iowa State University from 1958 until 1959.

Scholar career

In the IPB University 
After his graduation from the IPB University, Hadikoemoro was immediately appointed as the Expert Assistant for Meteorology and Climatology in the IPB University. Two years later, in 1960, he was appointed as the Head of the Climatology Studies, and in 1961 was appointed as the Chairman of the Natural Science Department of the IPB University.

In the Andalas University 
On 5 September 1962, the Minister of Higher Education and Science enacted a decree which formally appoints Hadikoemoro as the Dean of the Faculty of Agriculture in the Andalas University. After a year, on 1 May 1963, Hadikoemoro was transferred as the Dean of the Faculty of Mathematics and Natural Science, and was later promoted to the office of the Assistant Rector III of the Andalas University on 31 December 1963.

In the Cenderawasih University 
Three years later, Hadikoemoro received a decree dated 28 November 1965 about his appointment as the Dean of the Faculty of Agriculture in the Cenderawasih University since 1 February 1966.  Less than a year later, on 16 Juni 1966, he was appointed as the Assistant Rector I of the Cenderawasih University.

Rector of the Cenderawasih University 
After four years as an assistant rector, on 21 August 1970, Hadikoemoro was officially appointed by President Suharto as the Rector of the Cenderawasih University, replacing Colonel August Marpaung. He later held concurrent office as the acting Head of the Irian Jaya Regional Office of the Ministry of Education and Culture in 1 March 1971.

During this period, the university began regularly publishing the Irian scientific bulletin, which was the result of collaboration between the university and the Summer Institute of Linguistics (SIL).

He held the office as the Rector of the Cenderawasih University until 21 January 1975, when he was replaced by Rubini Atmawidjaja.

Director General of Private Colleges 
After ten years in Irian Jaya, Hadikoemoro was assigned an office with a nationwide authority. He was appointed by the Minister of Education and Culture as the Director General of Private Colleges.

Works

References

Bibliography 

1932 births
2013 deaths
Academic staff of Cenderawasih University
Academic staff of IPB University